Samara Rodrigues de Almeida (born ) is a Brazilian female volleyball player. With her club Sollys Nestlé Osasco she competed at the 2011 and 2012 FIVB Volleyball Women's Club World Championship. She was elected the Most Valuable Player of the 2009 FIVB Volleyball Girls' U18 World Championship.

Clubs
  Finasa Osasco (2007–2009)
  Macaé Sports (2009–2010)
  Finasa Osasco (2010–2013)
  Pinheiros (2013–2014)
  Sollys Osasco (2014–2015)
  Minas Tênis Clube (2015–2016)
  CSM Volei Alba Blaj (2016–2017)
  Volero Zürich (2017–2018)
  RC Cannes (2018–2019)
  Volley Bergamo (2019–2020)
  Radomka Radom (2020–2021)

Awards

Individuals
 2009 FIVB U18 World Championship – "Most Valuable Player"
 2010 U20 South American Championship – "Best Receiver"

External links
 profile at FIVB.org

References

1992 births
Living people
Brazilian women's volleyball players
Brazilian expatriate sportspeople in Switzerland
Brazilian expatriate sportspeople in Romania
Sportspeople from São Paulo
Brazilian expatriate sportspeople in Poland
Brazilian expatriate sportspeople in Italy
Brazilian expatriate sportspeople in France
Expatriate volleyball players in France
Expatriate volleyball players in Italy
Expatriate volleyball players in Switzerland
Expatriate volleyball players in Romania
Expatriate volleyball players in Poland